Sport was a free weekly sports magazine based in London which covered a wide range of events such as football, rugby, tennis and cricket as well as giving exclusive interviews with various sports personalities.

Overview
It started in France in 2003 as a free monthly and in March 2004 as a weekly. The London edition started on 29 September 2006, the first of its type in the UK and was sold to talkSPORT owners UTV Media (now Wireless Group) in 2009. Primarily aimed at males aged 13–45, Sport had a circulation of 304,700 making it the largest sports magazine in the UK. It was given to commuters outside London Underground and railway stations on Friday mornings and was also available in sports clubs and centres as well as hotels.

In 2011 the magazine launched an iPad app version, with the full print edition available for download each week plus video and audio features. The last edition of Sport was no. 484 that was released on 3 February 2017.

References

External links

2006 establishments in the United Kingdom
2017 disestablishments in the United Kingdom
Men's magazines published in the United Kingdom
Monthly magazines published in the United Kingdom
Sports magazines published in the United Kingdom
Weekly magazines published in the United Kingdom
Defunct magazines published in the United Kingdom
Free magazines
Magazines published in London
Magazines established in 2006
Magazines disestablished in 2017